Shillhope Law is a hill in the southern Cheviots, a range of hills in Northumberland, England. Shillhope Law is a relatively unremarkable member of this group; in common with its neighbours it has a small summit and steep, grassy sides falling to deeply incised valleys on either side. However, unlike its neighbours, the ridge connecting Shillhope Law to the higher dome of The Cheviot to the north is bisected by a low col at  m, giving it enough relative height to be a Marilyn.

The narrow road that climbs up Coquetdale from Alwinton to the foot of Shillhope Law eases any access problems. On the other side of the valley lies the Otterburn Training Area and training (without live ammunition) can take place on the northern side of Shillhope Law. Shillhope Law can be easily climbed from the farms on its western side, Barrowburn and Shillmoor, although the ascent is steep.

The view is not far-reaching in any direction because numerous hills and ridges of the same height or higher in all directions except south and south-east.

See also
 List of Marilyns in England

Cheviot Hills
Marilyns of England
Hills of Northumberland
Volcanism of England
Alwinton